Janus, in comics, may refer to:

 Janus (DC Comics), an alias of the DC Comics character Two-Face
 Janus (Marvel Comics), a Marvel Comics character, the son of Dracula
 Janus (Ultraverse), a character in the Ultraverse
 Janus Directive, a DC Comics crossover event
 Janus Stark, a Smash! comic character
 Judge Janus, a Judge Dredd character